Baron   was a general in the Imperial Japanese Army, politician, cabinet minister, and the Prime Minister of Japan from 1927 to 1929.

Early life and military career
Tanaka was born as the third son of a low-ranking samurai family in the service of Chōshū Domain in Hagi, Nagato Province (modern day Yamaguchi Prefecture), Japan. At the age of 13, he participated in the Hagi Rebellion. He had an interest in politics from an early age, serving on a village council and as an elementary school teacher. He only joined the Imperial Japanese Army at the age of 20.

He graduated from the former 8th class of Imperial Japanese Army Academy and the 8th class of the Army War College in 1892, and served as a junior officer during the First Sino-Japanese War. After the end of the war, he was sent as a military attaché to Moscow and Petrograd, and was in Russia at the same time as Takeo Hirose of the Imperial Japanese Navy, with whom he became close friends. Tanaka was fluent in the Russian language, which he learned while attending mass every Sunday at a Russian Orthodox church, which enabled him to practice his Russian at church social events, although it is uncertain if he ever actually converted to Christianity. As one of the few Russian experts within the military, he was an invaluable resource to Army planners during the Russo-Japanese War, and served as aide to General Kodama Gentarō in Manchuria.

In 1906, Tanaka helped draft a defense plan which was so highly regarded by the Imperial Japanese Army General Staff and General Yamagata Aritomo that it was adopted as basic policy until World War I. He was also awarded the Order of the Golden Kite (3rd class) in April 1906.

In 1910, he established a Veterans Association. Tanaka was promoted to major general in 1911, and was made director of the Military Affairs Bureau at the Ministry of the Army, where he recommended an increase in the strength of the standing army by two additional infantry divisions. He was awarded the Order of the Sacred Treasure (1st class) in September 1918. He joined the cabinet of Prime Ministers Hara Takashi as Army Minister from September 1918 to June 1921. He was promoted to full general in 1920 and was awarded the Order of the Rising Sun (1st class). He was also elevated to the title of danshaku (baron) under the kazoku peerage system. However, the Hara cabinet came under unceasing criticism due to the Nishihara Loans, the disastrous Nikolayevsk incident and accusations of Army misappropriation of secret funds, and supporting unsavory figures such as White Movement general Roman von Ungern-Sternberg. After suffering from an attack of angina, Tanaka resigned all posts, and retired to his summer home in Oiso, Kanagawa.

Political career

Tanaka returned as Army Minister in the 2nd Yamamoto administration from September 1923 to January 1924. After retiring from the army, Tanaka was invited to accept the post of party president of the Rikken Seiyūkai political party in 1925 and was made a member of the House of Peers from January 1926. He had been scheduled to be promoted to the rank of Field Marshal at the time of his retirement. However, when news reached the ears of the Army Ministry of a 3 million Yen bonus that Tanaka received on agreeing to join the Rikken Seiyukai, the promotion was denied.

Tanaka became Prime Minister of Japan on 20 April 1927, during the Shōwa financial crisis, serving simultaneously as the Foreign Affairs Minister. He later added the posts of Home Minister (4 May 1928 to 23 May 1928), and Colonial Affairs Minister (10 June 1929 to 2 July 1929) to his portfolio.

On the domestic front, Tanaka attempted to suppress leftists, Communists and suspected Communist sympathizers through widespread arrests (the 15 March incident of 1928, and the 19 April incident of 1929).

On foreign policy, Tanaka differed from his predecessor Shidehara both tactically and strategically. Whereas Shidehara preferred to evacuate Japanese residents where conflicts occurred with local people, Tanaka preferred using military force. On three separate occasions in 1927 and 1928 he sent troops to intervene militarily in Shandong Province to block Chiang Kai-shek's Northern Expedition to unify China under Kuomintang rule, in what became known as the Jinan Incident.

Tanaka came into office even as forces were already beginning to converge that would draw Japan into World War II. In 1928, however, the machinations of the ultranationalist secret societies and the Kwantung Army resulted in a crisis: the assassination of the Manchurian warlord Zhang Zuolin and the failed attempt to seize Manchuria. Tanaka himself was taken by surprise by the assassination plot and argued that the officers responsible should be publicly court-martialed for homicide. The military establishment, from which Tanaka was by now estranged, insisted on covering up the facts of the incident, which remained an official secret. Bereft of support, and under mounting criticism in the Diet and even from Emperor Hirohito himself, Tanaka and his cabinet resigned en masse on 2 July 1929.

Tanaka was succeeded by Hamaguchi Osachi, and died a few months after his resignation. He was awarded the Order of the Paulownia Flowers on his death. His grave is at the Tama Cemetery in Fuchū, Tokyo.

Tanaka Memorial
In 1929, China accused Tanaka of having authored the "Tanaka Memorial Imperialist Conquest Plan," which advocated the conquest of Manchuria, Mongolia, and eventually the whole of China. He was alleged to have presented the plan to the emperor in 1927. The plan was presented as fact in the wartime propaganda film series Why We Fight, which claimed that the plan envisaged the conquest of America after East Asia. In a memoir published in the mid-1950s, a Japanese-born Taiwanese businessman, Tsai Chih-Kan, claimed that he had personally copied the "Plan" from the Imperial Library on the night of 20 June 1928 in a covert action assisted by several of Japan's leading prewar politicians and officers, who were opposed to Tanaka. Today, most historians regard the document as a forgery.

Awards and decorations
From the corresponding article in the Japanese Wikipedia

Japanese
 1906 –  Order of the Golden Kite, 3rd class
 1918 –  Grand Cordon of the Order of the Sacred Treasure
 1920 –  Grand Cordon of the Order of the Rising Sun
 1929 –   Order of the Paulownia Flowers

Foreign
 1914 –   - Bulgaria, Order of Saint Alexander 2nd class
 1918 –   - China, Order of the Striped Tiger, 2nd class
 1927 –   - Poland, Order of Polonia Restituta, Grand Cordon
 1929 –   - Denmark, Order of the Dannebrog, 1st class
 1929 –   - UK, Knight Commander of The Most Distinguished Order of Saint Michael and Saint George (KCMG)
 1929 –   - UK, Knight Grand Cross of The Most Excellent Order of the British Empire (GBE)

References

Sources
 Gluck, Carol. Japan's Modern Myths. Princeton University Press (1987). 
Hane, Mikiso. Modern Japan: A Historical Survey. Westview Press (2001). 
Harries, Meirion. Soldiers of the Sun: The Rise and Fall of the Imperial Japanese Army. Random House; Reprint edition (1994). 
 Morton, William Finch. Tanaka Giichi and Japan's China Policy. New York: St. Martin's Press, 1980.

External links

 Biography at infoplease.com
 

1864 births
1929 deaths
Kazoku
People from Yamaguchi Prefecture
Japanese generals
Japanese military personnel of the First Sino-Japanese War
Japanese military personnel of the Russo-Japanese War
People of Meiji-period Japan
Rikken Seiyūkai politicians
20th-century prime ministers of Japan
20th-century Japanese politicians
Members of the House of Peers (Japan)
Foreign ministers of Japan
Prime Ministers of Japan
Grand Cordons of the Order of the Rising Sun
Recipients of the Order of the Sacred Treasure, 1st class
Recipients of the Order of the Golden Kite
Recipients of the Order of Polonia Restituta
Order of the Dannebrog
Politicians from Yamaguchi Prefecture